Paul Chong Hasang (1794 or 1795–September 22, 1839) was one of the Korean Martyrs. His feast day is September 22, and he is also venerated along with the rest of the 103 Korean martyrs on September 20.

Life and career
He was the son of the martyr Augustine Jeong Yak-Jong and a nephew of noted philosopher John Jeong Yak-Yong, who were among the first converts of Korea, who wrote the first catechism for the Catholic Church in Korea (entitled "Jugyo Yoji").

When Yakjong was martyred with Hasang's older brother, Yakjong's wife and the remaining children were spared and went into a rural place. Hasang was seven years old then.

When he grew up, Hasang chose to become a servant of a government interpreter; this enabled him to travel to Beijing multiple times, where he entreated the bishop of Beijing to send priests to Korea, and wrote to Pope Gregory XVI via the bishop of Beijing requesting the establishment of a diocese in Korea. This happened in 1825.

Some years later, Bishop Laurent-Marie-Joseph Imbert and two priests were sent. The bishop found Hasang to be talented, zealous, and virtuous; he taught him Latin and theology, and was about to ordain him when a persecution broke out. Hasang was captured and gave the judge a written statement defending Catholicism. The judge, after reading it, said, "You are right in what you have written; but the king forbids this religion, it is your duty to renounce it." Hasang replied, "I have told you that I am a Christian, and will be one until my death."

After this, Hasang went through a series of tortures in which his countenance remained tranquil. Finally, he was bound to a cross on a cart and cheerfully met his death, at the age of 45.

The Korean Martyrs are commemorated by the Roman Catholic Church with a memorial on 20 September. 103 of them, including Hasang, were canonized by Pope John Paul II in 1984.

References

Bibliography
The Lives of the 103 Korean Martyr Saints (4): St. Chong Ha-sang Paul (1795-1839), Catholic Bishops' Conference of Korea Newsletter No. 29 (Winter 1999).

External links 
 Paul Chong Hasang from Patron Saints Index

1794 births
1839 deaths
Korean Roman Catholic saints
19th-century Christian saints
Canonizations by Pope John Paul II
Joseon Christians